Hemantha Kumar Wickramasinghe  is Nicolaos G. and Sue Curtis Alexopoulos Presidential Chair in Electrical Engineering and Computer Science at the University of California, Irvine.

Education
He graduated from King's College London with a Bachelor of Science degree in Electronic and Electrical Engineering in 1970 and a PhD in Electronic and Electrical Engineering from University College London in 1974 where his advisor was Eric Ash.

Career and research
He was awarded the Joseph F. Keithley Award For Advances in Measurement Science in 2000. He was elected a Fellow of the Royal Society (FRS) in 2019. He is a member of the Center for Chemistry at the Space-Time Limit.

Personal life
He is the brother of noted mathematician, astronomer and astrobiologist Chandra Wickramasinghe.

References

Year of birth missing (living people)
Living people
Alumni of King's College London
Alumni of University College London
University of California, Irvine faculty
Fellows of the Royal Society